David Neiwert is an American freelance journalist and blogger. He received the National Press Club Award for Distinguished Online Journalism in 2000 for a domestic terrorism series he produced for MSNBC.com. Neiwert has concentrated in part on extremism in the Northwest.

Work 
He worked at newspapers around the Pacific Northwest from 1978 to 1996, notably in Idaho (at Sandpoint, Blackfoot, Lewiston, Moscow, and Twin Falls); Montana (Missoula); and in western Washington (Kent, Bellevue, and Seattle). He went to work at MSNBC.com in 1996 as a writer-producer, and continued there through late 2000. Since then, he has focused on writing books and producing his blog Orcinus, which tends to report on the crossover between the mainstream and the far right. The blog won early recognition in the liberal blogosphere in the form of consecutive Koufax Awards for Best Series in 2003 and 2004.

The Northwest Progressive Institute named its annual awards to the region's best liberal bloggers after Neiwert. He edited the political blog Crooks And Liars from 2008 to 2012. As of 2018, Neiwert worked with the Southern Poverty Law Center as their Pacific Northwest correspondent. His book, And Hell Followed With Her: Crossing the Dark Side of the American Border, won the 2014 International Latino Book Award for general nonfiction.

In January 2019, Neiwert left the SPLC blog Hatewatch to join Daily Kos as a correspondent.

Neiwert's 2020 book Red Pill, Blue Pill discusses how radicalization and conspiracy theories may be opposed on the individual level.

Personal life 
Neiwert was raised in Idaho Falls, Idaho. He comes from a German-American background and was brought up in the Methodist faith. According to Neiwert, sympathy for the John Birch Society was widespread amongst the population he grew up surrounded by and is "probably part of why I’m immune to conspiracism."

Neiwert attended the University of Idaho, where he obtained his B.A. in English (1984), as well as the University of Montana (1987–88), where he studied creative writing. He notes that he contributed to Republican political campaigns during this time.

He has been married since 1989 to Lisa Dowling of Helena, Montana. They live together in Seattle with their son.

Bibliography 
 In God's Country: The Patriot Movement and the Pacific Northwest, 1999
 Death on the Fourth of July: The Story of a Killing, a Trial, and Hate Crime in America, 2004
 Strawberry Days: How Internment Destroyed a Japanese American Community, 2005
 The Eliminationists: How Hate Talk Radicalized the American Right, 2009
 And Hell Followed With Her: Crossing the Dark Side of the American Border, 2013
 Of Orcas and Men: What Killer Whales Can Teach Us, 2015

 Neiwert, David (2020). Red Pill, Blue Pill: How to Counteract the Conspiracy Theories That Are Killing Us. Buffalo, New York: Prometheus Books. .

See also 
 I Don't Speak German

References

External links
 David Neiwert blogsite

Living people
American male journalists
American bloggers
People from Idaho Falls, Idaho
Writers from Idaho
Writers from Seattle
Place of birth missing (living people)
Year of birth missing (living people)
21st-century American non-fiction writers
American male bloggers